Maile Chapman is an American novelist and short story writer.

Chapman was born in Tacoma, Washington, and has a BA from The Evergreen State College and an MFA in Fiction from Syracuse University. She  is currently a PhD candidate and Schaeffer Fellow in Fiction at the University of Nevada, Las Vegas. Her first novel Your presence is requested at Suvanto was published by Graywolf Press in 2010 and was short-listed for the Guardian First Book Award. Her stories have appeared in A Public Space, Literary Review, the Mississippi Review, and Post Road.

References

Further reading
 Review of Your Presence Is Requested at Suvanto.

External links
Maile Chapman at Evergreen State College website

Year of birth missing (living people)
Living people
21st-century American novelists
American women short story writers
University of Nevada, Las Vegas people
American women novelists
21st-century American women writers
21st-century American short story writers